Bostrichobranchus is a genus of ascidian tunicates in the family Molgulidae.

Species within the genus Bostrichobranchus include:
 Bostrichobranchus digonas Abbott, 1951 
 Bostrichobranchus pilularis (Verrill, 1871) 
 Bostrichobranchus septum Monniot, 1978

Species names currently considered to be synonyms:
 Bostrichobranchus manhattensis Traustedt, 1883: synonym of Bostrichobranchus pilularis (Verrill, 1871) 
 Bostrichobranchus molguloides Metcalf, 1900: synonym of Bostrichobranchus pilularis (Verrill, 1871)

References

Stolidobranchia
Tunicate genera